Quercus marilandica, the blackjack oak, is a small oak, one of the red oak group Quercus sect. Lobatae. It is native to the eastern and central United States.

Description
They are dark green and glossy above, pubescent underneath, and often remain attached to the twigs through the winter after turning colors from red to brown in the fall.

Distribution and habitat 
The blackjack oak can be found from Long Island to Florida, west as far as Texas, Oklahoma, and Nebraska. There are reports of a few isolated populations in southern Michigan, but these appear to represent introductions.

Some sources say that it does not have the beautiful form of many oaks, but is nonetheless a valuable tree for growing in problem sites. Some say that the tree is "tough but ugly", but also underappreciated. At times the tree has even been actively eradicated to provide room for trees deemed to be more commercially valuable.

It is sometimes an understory tree in pine stands on sandy knolls in the southeastern US. Along the coastal plain of New Jersey the probability of finding this species is increased in relatively sunny, open areas such as those near coastal salt marshes. It often occurs near scarlet and post oaks as well as pitch pine; understory companions include winged sumac, bracken, sweetfern, and bayberry, and can be found as far north as parts of Ohio and New York.

A variety, Quercus marilandica Münchhausen var. ashei Sudworth, grows in the western portions of its range – northern Texas, Oklahoma, and into southern Kansas. In this area, blackjack and post oak form a semi-savanna area composed of forested strips intermixed with prairie grass glades along the eastern edge of the southern Great Plains. This semi-savanna is known as the Cross Timbers. Scrub forms of Q. marilandica dominate on many chert glades along with Q. stellata in Arkansas's Ozark plateau.

Ecology 
Blackjack oak sometimes hybridizes with bear oak (Q. ilicifolia), forming a hybrid known as Q. × brittonii.

Blackjack acorns provide food for both whitetail deer and wild turkey. Blackjacks may, however, cause tannic acid poisoning in cattle.

Uses
The wood is very dense and produces a hot flame when burned, which functions as an excellent source of heat for barbecues and wood-burning stoves. However, the wood is not desirable for wood fireplaces because the heat causes popping, thereby increasing the risk of house fires.

Traditionally blackjack wood is used as both a fuel and smoke wood for barbecue in Oklahoma.

References

External links

marilandica
Endemic flora of the United States
Trees of the Eastern United States
Trees of the Plains-Midwest (United States)
Trees of the South-Central United States
Trees of the Southeastern United States
Plants described in 1770
Taxa named by Otto von Münchhausen